The 2006 FIBA U18 Women's European Championship Division B was the second edition of the Division B of the FIBA U18 Women's European Championship, the second tier of the European women's under-18 basketball championship. It was played in Chieti, Italy, from 21 to 30 July 2006. Italy women's national under-18 basketball team won the tournament.

Participating teams

  (15th place, 2005 FIBA Europe Under-18 Championship for Women Division A)

  (16th place, 2005 FIBA Europe Under-18 Championship for Women Division A)

First round
In the first round, the teams were drawn into four groups. The first two teams from each group advance to the Quarterfinal round (Groups E and F); the other teams will play in the Classification round (Group G).

Group A

Group B

Group C

Group D

Quarterfinal round
In the Quarterfinal round, the teams play in two groups of four. The first two teams from each group advance to the Semifinals; the third and fourth teams will play in the 5th–8th place playoffs.

Group E

Group F

Classification round for 9th–14th place

Group G

5th–8th place playoffs

5th–8th place semifinals

7th place match

5th place match

Championship playoffs

Semifinals

3rd place match

Final

Final standings

References

2006
2006–07 in European women's basketball
FIBA Europe
International youth basketball competitions hosted by Italy
FIBA U18
FIBA